The Medal of Merit for National Defence is a decoration of the Ministry of National Defence of Poland. Established 21 April 1966 and revised in 1991, the medal recognizes meritorious service which strengthens the military of the Republic of Poland.  Members of the Polish military and civilian employees are eligible for this medal.  The equivalent award that is presented to foreign nationals is the Polish Army Medal.

References

Military awards and decorations of Poland